Pineas Jacob (born 29 October 1985) is a Namibian footballer) who plays as a defender with Ramblers F.C. and the Namibia national football team.

International career
He has 2 caps for Namibia and was on the squad which appeared at the 2008 Africa Cup of Nations, though he did not appear. He made his debut with Namibia in a friendly against Saudi Arabia.

Honours

Individual
 Namibia Premier League top scorer: 2007–08

References

External links
 
 

1985 births
Living people
Footballers from Windhoek
Namibia international footballers
Association football forwards
Ramblers F.C. players
F.C. Civics Windhoek players
United Africa Tigers players
AmaZulu F.C. players
Black Africa S.C. players
Mighty Gunners F.C. players
Namibia Premier League players
South African Premier Division players
Namibian expatriate footballers
Namibian expatriate sportspeople in South Africa
Expatriate soccer players in South Africa
2008 Africa Cup of Nations players
Namibian men's footballers